Sary-Kamysh is a village in Jalal-Abad Region of Kyrgyzstan, near the town Tashkömür. It is part of Nooken District. Its population was 48 in 2021.

References
 

Populated places in Jalal-Abad Region